Johanna Monica Elisabeth Westerberg Johansson (born 24 November 1977) is a Swedish professional golfer.

Westerberg was born in Linköping, Sweden. She resides in Södertälje, Sweden.

Westerberg turned professional in 2000 and has been a member of the Ladies European Tour since 2002. She played under her maiden name, Johanna Westerberg, until she got married in 2004. She competed as Johanna Waldh until her divorce in 2006. She is now married to tennis professional Joachim Johansson and they have one child.

She won her first tournament, Ladies Open of Portugal, in 2009.

Professional wins (1)

Ladies European Tour (1)
2009 Ladies Open of Portugal

References

External links

Swedish female golfers
Ladies European Tour golfers
Sportspeople from Östergötland County
Sportspeople from Linköping
People from Södertälje
1977 births
Living people